Wieger may refer to:
 Wieger Mensonides (born 1938), Dutch swimmer
 David Michael Wieger, a screenwriter of Wild America
 Léon Wieger (1856–1933), French Jesuit missionary in China 
 Wieger rifle series, a series of German firearms based on the AK-74

See also
 Wiegert
 Wiegers